KCCA-LP (92.1 FM) is a radio station broadcasting a religious broadcasting format. Licensed to Anthony, Kansas, United States. The station is currently owned by The Christian Church of Anthony, Kansas.

References

External links
What is KCCA’s mission statement

CCA-LP
Radio stations established in 2006
CCA-LP
Harper County, Kansas